Andrey Sergeyevich Nikitin (born 26 November 1979) is a Russian economist and government official. He serves as the Governor of Novgorod Oblast.

Biography 
Andrey Nikitin was born on 26 November 1979. Although he was born in Moscow, he lived in Miass, Chelyabinsk Oblast for almost 16 years. After graduation in 2001, he entered the State University of Management (GUU, Moscow), and received a diploma in the specialty "State and Municipal Management". He continued his postgraduate studies, in 2006 he defended his thesis on "The Strategy of Organizational Change as an Instrument of Effective Management (Methodological Aspect)" and became a candidate of economic sciences. In 2008, Nikitin was awarded the MBA from the Stockholm School of Economics. The same year he became associate professor of the Department of Theory of Organization and Management of the State University of Management.

On 13 February 2017, Andrey Nikitin was appointed as the acting Governor of Novgorod Oblast by decree of Russian President Vladimir Putin. On 10 September 2017, having collected 67.99% of the vote, he was elected Governor of the Novgorod Region. He will took office as Governor of the Novgorod Region on 14 October 2017.

In 2018 he defended his doctoral dissertation on "Formation and effective functioning of regional management teams" and became a doctor of economic Sciences.

He was awarded the Medal of the Order "For Merit to the Fatherland" II degree, has the Gratitude of the President.

He is a member of the Presidium of the presidential Council for economic modernization and innovative development of Russia, and a member of the Presidium of the State Council of the Russian Federation. He is also a member of the Supervisory Board of the Agency for Strategic Initiatives to promote new projects.

References 

1979 births
Living people
United Russia politicians
State University of Management alumni
Academic staff of the State University of Management
Politicians from Moscow
Acting heads of the federal subjects of Russia
Governors of Novgorod Oblast
21st-century  Russian economists
Recipients of the Medal of the Order "For Merit to the Fatherland" II class